The Ministry of Culture and Tourism is a government ministry of the Republic of Turkey, responsible for culture and tourism affairs in Turkey. Revolving fund management of the ministry is carried by DÖSİMM. On January 25, 2013, Ömer Çelik was appointed as minister following a cabinet change succeeding Ertuğrul Günay, who was in office since 2008.

Ministry functions
One of the responsibilities of the ministry is the preservation of manuscripts, so they are available and accessible to researchers.

Trivia
In promoting the country, the ministry often created promotional films for the country. In 2015, the ministry gained controversy after axing a scene from a $4 million-dollar promotional involving Julianne Moore due to her allegedly "poor acting". Ruhsar Demirel, of the Nationalist Movement Party, asked social affairs minister Ayşenur İslam: "How reasonable do you find promoting Turkey with the body of such names and women? How do you find, as a woman, giving plenty of money to a Hollywood star to promote Turkey, as if it were the 19th century?", and other politicians criticised her for a "depressive persona". In 2017, alongside Turkish Airlines and Turkish tourism companies, the Ministry of Culture and Tourism helped finance Non-Transferable, a romantic comedy film produced by Brendan Bradley.

In June 2018, the Ministry has sent a directive to the head of the excavations team in Turkey notifying them that according to a new regulation, 51 percent of archaeological excavation teams led by foreign crews should consist of Turkish nationals, the key posts in excavations such as archaeologist, anthropologist, art historian, restaurateur, architect, and photographer, should be reserved for Turkish citizens.

See also
Tourism in Turkey

References

External links 

Tourism portal
Tourism Strategy of Turkey - 2023 (2007)

 
2003 establishments in Turkey
Turkey
Turkey
Turkey, Culture And Tourism
Ministries established in 2003